Bairuopu is a town in  Wangcheng district, Changsha, Hunan, China. the town is located on the southwest of the district, and bordered by Jinzhou town of Ningxiang and Wushan Subdistrict to the north, Leifeng Subdistrict to the east, Yucangping and Lianhua towns to the south, Xiaduopu town of Ningxiang to the west. The village-level divisions were adjusted from 15 into 11 ones on March 23, 2016; there are one residential community and 10 villages under its jurisdiction. its administrative centre is at Wulidui.

Subdivisions
There were 14 villages and a residential community in 2015. According to the result on adjustment of the divisions of Bairuopu on March 23, 2016, the village-level divisions were adjusted from 15 into 11 ones; there are one residential community and 10 villages under its jurisdiction.

Gallery

References

External links

Township-level divisions of Wangcheng
Wangcheng